Benjamin White or Ben White may refer to:

 Benjamin White (Maine politician) (1790–1860), U.S. Representative from Maine
 Benjamin White (publisher) (c. 1725–1794), publisher
 Benjamin F. White (Montana politician) (1833–1920), 10th Territorial Governor of Montana
 Benjamin Franklin White (1800–1879), "shape note" singer
 Ben White (artist), British artist
 Ben White (cricketer) (born 1998), Irish cricketer
 Ben White (environmentalist) (1951–2005), arborist, environmentalist and Native American rights activist
 Ben White (finance journalist), American journalist
 Ben White (footballer) (born 1997), English footballer
 Ben White (rugby league) (born 1994), English rugby league player
 Ben White (rugby union, born 1983), Australian rugby union player
 Ben White (rugby union, born 1998), Scottish rugby union scrum-half
 Ben Chester White (1899–1966), black caretaker, uninvolved in the civil rights movement, shot down by the KKK